Chionanthus polycephalus is a tree in the family Oleaceae. The specific epithet polycephalus means "many-headed", referring to the inflorescence.

Description
Its bark is dark grey. The flowers are creamy white.

Distribution and habitat
Chionanthus polycephalus is endemic to Borneo, where it is confined to Sarawak. This habitat is at risk from clearing for agriculture.

References

polycephalus
Endemic flora of Borneo
Trees of Borneo
Plants described in 1980